Churchkhela is a traditional Georgian candle-shaped candy. 

The main ingredients of Churchkhela are grape must, nuts, and flour. Almonds, walnuts, hazelnuts, and chocolate and sometimes raisins are threaded onto a string, dipped in thickened grape must, mulberry juice, or fruit juices and dried in the shape of a sausage. In eastern Georgia, churchkhela production begins with a condensed juice called tatara, made from must from local grapes in the areas of Kakheti, Kartli or Meskheti thickened with wheat flour. Wheat flour is also used for making condensed mulberry juice in the area of Samtskhe-Javakheti. Corn flour is used in western Georgia (the areas of Racha, Lechkhumi, Guria, Samegrelo, Abkhazia or Achara), and this condensed grape juice is called pelamushi. In Abkhazia, a region in the North Caucus Mountains of Georgia, it is known as  "Аджинджук" ("Adzhindzhukhua" or "Ajinjuk")" in the local Abkhaz language and is touted as the best souvenir for gifting. 

Georgian warriors carried Churchkhelas with them because they contain many calories. 

The traditional technology of churchkhela in the Kakheti region was inscribed on the Intangible Cultural Heritage of Georgia list in 2015.

Outside Georgia
Churchkhela and its varieties are popular in several countries besides Georgia, such as Armenia, Azerbaijan, Turkey, Iraq, Syria, Iran, Cyprus, Greece, Russia, and Ukraine. In Persian, it's known as باسلوق شیره انگور[]. In Aleppo, Syria it is known as jok malbal جق ملبل. In Armenian, Greek, and Turkish it is known as "sujuk", which is actually a dry sausage. To distinguish the two, it is sometimes referred to as "sweet sujukh" (քաղցր սուջուխ, kaghtsr sujukh) in Armenian (շարոց, sharots in Western Armenian), and cevizli sucuk ("walnut sujuk") in Turkish. It is known in Cypriot Greek as shoushoukos (σιουσιούκκος) and as  soutzouki (σουτζούκι,) τζουτζούκι (tzoutzoúki Or jutsuki,) and tσούτσελα (tsoútsela) in Greece. Several related sweets are made in Greece during the autumn grape harvest by thickening grape must, to include the grape molasses πετιμέζι Pekmez (petimezi), the grape must pudding called μουσταλευριά (Moustalevria,) and grape must cookies called μουστοκούλουρα (moustokouloura.) 
Another variant of Churchkhela, traditionally called Kelawo, is prepared in the Gilgit Baltistan region of Pakistan. It was locally marketed as Hunza chocolate, but as Kelawo does not contain any cocoa, it is now renamed as Hunza Candy.

The Cypriot variety is made by dipping strings of almonds into jelly, called palouzes (παλουζές).

Preparation
Churchkhela is a homemade Georgian product. Georgians usually make Churchkhela in Autumn when the primary ingredients, grapes and nuts, are harvested. It is a string of walnut halves that have been dipped in grape juice called Tatara or Phelamushi (grape juice thickened with flour), and dried in the sun.  No sugar is added to make real Churchkhela. Instead of walnuts, sometimes hazelnuts or almonds are used in the regions of west Georgia.

The juice is placed in a large bronze cauldron and heated slowly. A small amount of a special white earth called asproi is added to the boiling must and causes impurities to rise to the surface, where they are collected and removed. It is possible to substitute asproi, when not available, with lager beer, which has a similar result. Once the cleansing process is complete, the liquid is left to cool. Next, flour is added while stirring and heating the mixture. When it reaches the right consistency, based on the rate of steam bubbles and the viscosity of the mixture, it is removed from the heat. The mix, called Badagi, is now ready for use in the next step in the process of making Churchelas, which consists of preparing the nuts for dipping.

Before they are threaded, the nuts have to be shelled and dipped into water in order to soften them. Once soft enough, they are strung onto 2-3 meter-long threads. The strings are dipped in the Badagi mixture until completely covered. This process is repeated several times (usually three times) until the Churchkhelas has the desired thickness. Churchkhelas strings are then left to dry for 5–6 days. They are then ready for consumption or storage, even though some people like to eat it fresh.

Consumption
Churchkhela is a between-meals snack and is also served as a dessert during New Year and Christmas celebrations.

Traditionally, in times of war women would send their men Churchkhela to eat at the front, because of its pragmatic size, ability not to mold for long periods of time, and heavy texture that keeps one full.

Gallery

See also
 Gozinaki
 List of grape dishes
 Pestil

References

External links
 

Cuisine of Georgia (country)
Grape dishes
Georgian products with protected designation of origin
Almond desserts
Nut confections